Viserys Targaryen is the name of three kings from the fictional House Targaryen in A Song of Ice and Fire and works based on it:

 Viserys I Targaryen, a character in the novel The Princess and the Queen and the television series House of the Dragon.
 Viserys II Targaryen, a character in The Princess and the Queen under the title Prince Viserys.
 Viserys III Targaryen, a character in the novel A Game of Thrones and season 1 of the television series Game of Thrones.

See also 
 List of A Song of Ice and Fire characters
 List of Game of Thrones characters